Anguilla at the 2002 Commonwealth Games was represented by Anguilla Amateur Athletic Association (AAAA) and abbreviated ANG.

Anguilla was first represented the 1998 Commonwealth Games in Kuala Lumpur. This was Anguilla's second Games.

Medals

Athletics
Women's 100 Metres
 Desiree Cocks - 7th in Heat 4, 12.88 s

Women's 200 Metres
 Shyrone Hughes - 5th in Heat 3, 26.33 s

Officials

The Chef de Mission of the Anguillan team was former Hampshire County Cricket Club fast bowler, Cardigan Connor.

Nations at the 2002 Commonwealth Games
2002
Commonwealth Games